The 2007 NACAC Combined Events Championships were held in Santo Domingo, Dominican Republic, at the Estadio Olímpico Félix Sánchez on May 26–27, 2007. 
A detailed report on the event and an appraisal of the results was given.

Complete results were published.

Medallists

Results

Men's Decathlon
Key

Women's Heptathlon
Key

Participation
An unofficial count yields the participation of 27 athletes from 10 countries.

 (2)
 (2)
 (1)
 (5)
 (5)
 (1)
 (1)
 (1)
 (3)
 (6)

See also
 2007 in athletics (track and field)

References

Pan American Combined Events Cup
NACAC Combined Events Championships
International athletics competitions hosted by the Dominican Republic
NACAC Combined Events Championships